"American Girl" is a rock song written by Tom Petty and recorded by Tom Petty and the Heartbreakers for their self-titled debut album in 1976. It was released as a single and did not chart in the United States, but peaked at No. 40 in the UK for the week ending August 27, 1977. It was re-released in 1994 as the second single from Petty's Greatest Hits album and peaked at No. 68 in the U.S. Cash Box Top 100.

Despite limited chart success, "American Girl" became one of Petty's most popular songs and a staple of classic rock. It has been consistently rated as his best song, only surpassed by "Free Fallin'" otherwise, and one of the best rock songs of all time, and has been called "more than a classic rock standard — it's practically part of the American literary canon." It has also been used in several movies and television shows, often during a scene in which a character, much like the protagonist in the song's lyrics, is "longing for something bigger than their current existence."

"American Girl" was the last song performed in concert by Tom Petty and the Heartbreakers. They played it to close out the encore of their performance on September 25, 2017, at the Hollywood Bowl in Los Angeles, California, the final concert of their 40th Anniversary Tour. Petty died of complications from cardiac arrest after an accidental prescription medication overdose on October 2, just over a week later.

It is ranked number 169 on Rolling Stones list of The 500 Greatest Songs of All Time.

Composition and recording
"American Girl" was written by Petty around the time he and the Heartbreakers signed their first recording contract. It was recorded on the 4th of July in 1976, the Bicentennial of the United States.

"American Girl" uses standard rock instrumentation of electric guitars, electric bass, drums, and keyboards. The tempo is fast and "urgent," and is built on a repeated jangling guitar riff based on a "Bo Diddley beat." As described in Rolling Stone, "The supercharged riff set the template for decades of Petty hits, but it was also an homage to the Byrds: Petty and Mike Campbell's twin guitars mirrored Roger McGuinn's 12-string, infusing the folk-rock sounds of the 1960s with New Wave energy."

 Lyrics and rumors 

Due to the lyrics about a desperate girl on a balcony hearing "cars roll by out on 441," the song was rumored to have been written about a college student who committed suicide by jumping from the Beaty Towers residence hall at the University of Florida in Gainesville, Florida. Beaty Towers is located on the edge of the university campus alongside U.S. Route 441 (called NW 13th Street through the city), and the residence hall opened in 1967, when Petty was still a teenager living in his hometown of Gainesville.

According to Carl Van Ness, the University of Florida's former historian, there have been many suicides in the school's history, but since the university does not keep a file of them, he "doesn't know for sure" if any involved a jump from Beaty Towers. University of Florida spokesman Steve Orlando said that no one has committed suicide by jumping off Beaty Towers, which would be a difficult endeavor since the dorm rooms have narrow windows and no balconies.

When asked directly about the story in the book Conversations with Tom Petty, Petty responded:

In the same interview, Petty says that he wrote the song while living in California:

The opening line lyric "raised on promises" echoes a line of dialogue in Francis Ford Coppola's 1963 film, Dementia 13. Referring to another woman, the character Louise says (at minute 17), "Especially an American girl. You can tell she's been raised on promises."

Single track listings
"American Girl" b/w "Fooled Again (I Don't Like It)"Shelter 62007 
"American Girl" b/w "The Wild One, Forever"Shelter WIP6377 
"American Girl" b/w "Luna"  *Shelter WIP6403 * taken from The Official Live Bootleg

 Personnel Tom Petty and the HeartbreakersTom Petty – rhythm guitar , lead vocals
Mike Campbell – lead guitar, rhythm guitar 
Ron Blair – bass guitar
Stan Lynch – drums
Benmont Tench – piano, Hammond organ

with

Phil Seymour – all backing vocals

Reception
"American Girl" is widely considered one of Petty's greatest works. The song was ranked number one on Billboards list of Petty's 20 greatest songs and on Rolling Stones list of Petty's 50 greatest songs. Cash Box said that it "rides along with a nice thump and an unusual, syncopated instrumental section."

ChartsOriginal releaseReissue2017'''

Certifications

In popular culture

Tom Petty and the Heartbreakers performed the song on the BBC2 television show The Old Grey Whistle Test in 1978.

The song has been featured in several Hollywood films and episodes of television shows, most notably FM (1978), Fast Times at Ridgemont High (1982), The Silence of the Lambs (1991), The Sopranos (1999), Scrubs (2001), Chasing Liberty (2004), Parks and Recreation (2009), Ricki and the Flash (2015) and The Handmaid's Tale (2017).  Its use in The Silence of the Lambs made the list of Top 11 Uses of Classic Rock in Cinema at UGO.

According to Petty, The Strokes have admitted to taking the riff for their 2001 single, "Last Nite", from this song. In a 2006 interview with Rolling Stone magazine, Petty said "The Strokes took 'American Girl', and I saw an interview with them where they actually admitted it. That made me laugh out loud. I was like, 'OK, good for you.'  It doesn't bother me." The Strokes played as an opening act for Tom Petty and the Heartbreakers for several dates of their 2006 tour.

Cover versions
Roger McGuinn of The Byrds (a major influence on Petty's music), released his own version of "American Girl" on his Thunderbyrd LP in 1977. The similarity between Petty's record and The Byrds' musical style was so strong that when his manager first played "American Girl" for him, McGuinn asked "When did I write that song?"

"American Girl" has also been covered by the following artists: The Killers, The Shins, Jason Isbell, Green Day, Elle King, Taylor Swift, The Gaslight Anthem, Goo Goo Dolls, Gin Blossoms, Larkin Poe, Matthew Sweet, Of Montreal, Big Mean Turtle,and Pearl Jam.

All appearancesTom Petty & The HeartbreakersPack up the Plantation: Live!Greatest HitsPlaybackAnthology: Through the YearsRunnin' Down a DreamThe Live AnthologyMojo Tour 2010''

See also
1977 in music

References

1976 songs
1977 singles
American new wave songs
Everclear (band) songs
Songs written by Tom Petty
Tom Petty songs
University of Florida
Shelter Records singles
Island Records singles
Song recordings produced by Denny Cordell
Jangle pop songs